Jibong yuseol ("Topical Discourses of Jibong") is a Korean encyclopedia written by Yi Su-gwang. It was published in 1614 during the reign of King Gwanghaegun. The author was a silhak scholar and a military officer of the mid-Joseon period of Korea. The title came from his pen name, Jibong and yuseol which literally means "topical discourses" in Korean.

Overview
Parts of the book are drawn from Su-gwang's experiences in the Ming Dynasty, meeting people from modern day Italy, Thailand, Vietnam, Okinawa.
After the Imjin wars from 1592 to 1598, Yi Su-gwang worked in the Ming Dynasty. In China, he acquired several books written on Catholicism by an Italian priest, Matteo Ricci, who was living in China. He brought them back to Korea, which was the first time European literature had been brought into the country. He took great interest in Catholicism.

From the information he obtained from the trips, he wrote a 20-volume encyclopedia, with the title Jibong yuseol. Jibong yuseol contained not only information on Catholicism and China, but also on Japan, Vietnam, and Thailand. It had basic information on Europe, including the geography and weather of England, European cuisine, European weapons and the knowledge of astronomy that the author had acquired from China.

Yi visited China several times and even met Thai people (known then as Seomra people, 섬라사람) and recorded their customs. He also had contact with emissaries from Vietnam and Okinawa.

See also
Silhak
Sanrim gyeongje
Korean studies

References

External links
 The original texts and translated in modern Korean at KRpia

Korean encyclopedias
Joseon dynasty works
1614 books
17th-century encyclopedias